Rezaabad Juchin (also Romanized as Reẕāābād Jūchīn; also known as Reẕāābād) is a village in Naqsh-e Rostam Rural District, in the Central District of Marvdasht County, Fars Province, Iran. At the 2006 census, its population was 598, in 141 families.

References 

Populated places in Marvdasht County